The 1958 German Grand Prix was a Formula One race held on 3 August 1958 at Nürburgring. It was race 8 of 11 in the 1958 World Championship of Drivers and race 7 of 10 in the 1958 International Cup for Formula One Manufacturers.

To increase participation, the organizers opened the field to Formula 2 cars. Also, the race distance was shortened to 15 laps from 22 previously. The two races were run at the same time but the Formula 2 entries (shown in yellow) were not eligible for World Championship points and some sources do not consider these starts in career stats. Peter Collins died after an accident on the 11th lap, as rival Tony Brooks went on to victory. On lap 11 during the race while Collins was pushing his Ferrari to the limit chasing Tony Brooks' Vanwall in the Pflanzgarten section, Collins had a fatal accident as his Ferrari ran too wide, crashed into a ditch and went flying into the air. His car then somersaulted and he struck a tree head first. Although he was given medical treatment he died in hospital later that day. Brooks said in his biography that Collins drove harder than any other driver he had ever faced in his racing career.  But others believed he had almost suffered the same incident as Luigi Musso did at the 1958 French Grand Prix earlier that season and that this race had the rivalry that was similar to the Collins and Fangio duel 2 years before.

Classification

Qualifying

Race

Notes
 – Despite being the fifth-placed Formula One car, Allison scored no points because he finished tenth on the road behind five Formula Two cars
 – 1 point for fastest lap

Championship standings after the race

Drivers' Championship standings

Constructors' Championship standings

 Notes: Only the top five positions are included for both sets of standings. Only the best six results counted towards each Championship. Numbers without parentheses are Championship points; numbers in parentheses are total points scored.

References

German Grand Prix
German Grand Prix
German Grand Prix